The Moravian Historical Society in Nazareth, Pennsylvania, was founded in 1857. Its mission is to preserve, interpret, and celebrate the rich culture of the Moravians. It is the third oldest historical society in the Commonwealth of Pennsylvania. The Moravian Historical Society is housed in the 1740-1743 Whitefield House on the Ephrata Tract in downtown Nazareth. The Moravian Historical Society is affiliated with the Moravian Archives in Bethlehem, Pennsylvania, the repository for records of the Moravian Church in North America, Northern Province.

The Moravian Historical Society collects objects relating to Moravian history in North America, provides research assistance, publishes, and offers lectures, programs, events, and activities for all ages and levels of interest.

Site 
The Moravian Historical Society owns three acres of land in Nazareth, PA, called the Ephrata Tract. It was on this site that the First House of Nazareth once stood. It operates out of two buildings on the Tract: the 1740-1743 Whitefield House and the 1740 Gray Cottage, the oldest extant Moravian structure in North America.

Ephrata Tract 
In 1740, a Moravian group from Savannah, Georgia was hired by landowner and British cleric George Whitefield to build a school for orphaned slaves. Whitefield wanted to build his school on a 5000-acre area he called Nazareth, which he had purchased from William Allen that same year. Tensions arising from theological disputes between Whitefield and the Moravians led the Moravians to purchase and begin to establish Bethlehem, Pennsylvania, leaving Whitefield's school building unfinished. When Whitefield later went bankrupt, the Moravians purchased the 5000 acres, which included the Gray Cottage, First House, and the bottom portion of the Whitefield House. This area became known as the Ephrata Tract. The town of Nazareth was laid out in 1771 several blocks to the west. The First House was demolished in 1864, but the Whitefield House and Gray Cottage still stand. The buildings were added to the National Register of Historic Places on May 1, 1980.

Whitefield House 
Construction on the Whitefield House started in 1740 and completed in 1743. It was originally used to house 32 married couples arriving from England. Through the years, the Whitefield House operated as a place of worship, girls’ boarding school, nursery, the Moravian Theological Seminary, and apartments for furloughed missionaries. Today, the Whitefield House houses the Museum of the Moravian Historical Society as well as administrative offices, and a gift shop. The museum runs a series of permanent and changing exhibitions about the history and culture of the Moravians and their contributions to  history.

Gray Cottage 
The Gray Cottage was constructed in October 1740 by the Moravians as protection from the harsh winter weather ahead. It is an oak log structure, and was originally called the “Old Block House” from the German word Block, meaning “log.” From 1743-1745, the building was used as a boys’ school. It has also been used as a girls’ school, a home for widows, a nursery, and a private residence. It is the oldest Moravian building still standing in North America.

First House 

Constructed in June 1740, the First House sheltered Moravians during the construction of the Whitefield House. It was approximately 30’ wide by 20’ deep, and stood two and one half stories tall. It was demolished in 1864, but the foundation was discovered by archaeologists in September 2014 in the area between the Whitefield House and the Gray Cottage. Several artifacts including redware pottery and a brass horse bell were also discovered. A small stone marker stands on this site.

Monuments 
The Moravian Historical Society has placed several markers at locations of American Moravian historical significance:
 The First House of Nazareth marker: A small stone marker on the Ephrata Tract indicating the location of Nazareth's First House, which was demolished in 1864.
 Meniolagomeka in Monroe County (near Kunkletown), PA: Dedicated on October 22, 1901, at the former site of the Delaware Native American town of Meniolagomeka. Several Moravian missionaries labored here from 1752-1755.
 Wechquetank in Monroe County (near Gilbert), PA: Dedicated on May 31, 1907, at the former site of the Delaware village of Wechquetank, which means willow tree in the Delaware language. The site was a Moravian mission from 1750-1756 and 1760-1763.
 The Rose Inn in Northampton County (Upper Nazareth), PA: Built in 1752 by the Moravians; it was used as housing for refugees from 1755-1756. It formally closed in 1772, and was demolished in 1858. A stone marker sits on the original site near a barn made partially from wood of the original inn.
 Shekomeko in Dutchess County (near Pine Plains), NY: Dedicated to the Mahican Native American village of Shekomeko, the first Native Christian congregation in America. Moravian missionaries worked there from 1740-1746, until new legislation expelled them from the area. The original monument was dedicated at the site of missionary Gottlieb Buettner's grave at Shekomeko on October 5, 1859, and rededicated as its current, more accessible site on June 22, 1926.
 Gnadenhuetten in Borough of Lehighton, Carbon County, PA: Dedicated to the mission at the village of Gnadenhuetten. The village was destroyed in a massacre during the French and Indian War on Nov. 24, 1755.
 Dansbury Mission in Monroe County (Stroudsburg), PA: Dedicated on June 25, 1931, to the Moravian mission that began in 1747, and was destroyed during the French and Indian War in 1755.
 Friedenshuetten in Bradford County (near Wyalusing), PA: Dedicated on June 15, 1871, at the former Native American mission village of Wyalusing, 1763-1772.
 Gnadensee (Indian Lake) in Litchfield County (near Sharon), CT: Dedicated on October 6, 1859, at Wechquanach near Shekomeko overlooking the Gnadensee. Missionary David Bruce's body was carried over the Gnadensee to Wechquanach in 1749.

Collections 
The Whitefield House Museum's collection contains over 10,000 Moravian objects, which are featured in permanent and changing exhibits. Highlights from the collections include:
 23 oil paintings by John Valentine Haidt (1700-1780), the first artist in Colonial America to portray chiefly religious topics,
 A 1776 pipe organ made by David Tannenberg, the most important organ-builder of his time,
 The Antes violin: the earliest-known violin made in the American Colonies,
 A cocklestove made prior to 1775,
 Rare first editions of books written by John Amos Comenius, the "Father of Modern Education." 
The museum also contains a large collection of Moravian mission artifacts from six continents, as well as various textiles, household goods, and Native American artifacts.

The entire collection is available to researchers by appointment.

The museum operates from 1-4pm, seven days a week except for major holidays including Thanksgiving, Christmas, and Easter.

Publications 
The Moravian Historical Society publishes various guides and periodicals, including:
 Transactions of the Moravian Historical Society-a publication that ran in volumes from 1868-2000.
 Journal of Moravian History-a biannual publication and expanded version of Transactions, created in 2006 in collaboration with the Moravian Archives and now published by Pennsylvania State University Press. It features scholarly articles, translations of Moravian source material, and book reviews.
 Abundant Heritage Newsletter of the Moravian Historical Society-a biannual newsletter featuring events and programs run by the Moravian Historical Society.
 Moravian Walking Tour and Guidebook of the Lehigh Valley-a guidebook highlighting the Moravian sites in Nazareth, Bethlehem, Emmaus, Allentown, Easton, and Christian's Spring.
 Nazareth (Images of America)-a photobook depicting the history of Nazareth from settlement to present

Events 
The Moravian Historical Society offers a variety of events for all ages and interest levels. Historic Nazareth Walking Tours meet at the Whitefield House every second Saturday at 4 p.m., and feature a tour guide in historic Moravian dress. The museum's Free Summer Sundays offer families a free museum tour as well as historic youth crafts and games. Monthly lecture and music programs allows visitors to explore Moravian and local history through lectures, music, screenings, and various family activities.

For children, the Moravian Historical Society holds an annual Hands-On History summer camp. The week-long camp allows campers to be immersed in history as they engaged in nature, archaeology, and art-based activities inspired by objects from our world-renowned collection. The Moravian Historical Society also holds an annual Arts & Crafts Festival featuring more than 100 craft vendors as well as food and free kids’ activities.

The Moravian Historical Society hosts the annual Share the Heritage Auction and Dinner to raise funds that support for its mission and its many activities and events.

Annual Meeting, Lecture, and Reception 
Since 1858, the Moravian Historical Society has hosted an Annual Meeting, Lecture, and Reception to present the state of the Society and to give a lecture on an aspect of Moravian history. Each year features a keynote speaker, as follows:

References 

Historical societies in Pennsylvania
Moravian settlement in Pennsylvania
History of the America (North) Province of the Moravian Church
Northampton County, Pennsylvania